Heterogaster is a genus of seed bugs in the family Heterogastridae. There are about 11 species, nine of the Old World, and two of the New World.

Species include:
Heterogaster affinis
Heterogaster artemisiae
Heterogaster behrensii
Heterogaster flavicosta
Heterogaster urticae (Fabricius, 1775) - the "Nettle Ground Bug"

References

Pentatomomorpha genera
Lygaeoidea